Nelson Fernando Ramos Betancourt (born November 23, 1981) is a Colombian goalkeeper who plays for Boca Juniors de Cali. He was a member of the Colombia squad during the 2011 Copa América. In 2021, Ramos set a record after being the first goalkeeper to score goals from free kicks in three consecutive matches.

See also
List of goalscoring goalkeepers

References

1981 births
Living people
Association football goalkeepers
Colombian footballers
Colombian expatriate footballers
Colombia international footballers
2011 Copa América players
Categoría Primera A players
Categoría Primera B players
Deportivo Pasto footballers
La Equidad footballers
América de Cali footballers
Millonarios F.C. players
S.D. Quito footballers
Jaguares de Córdoba footballers
Fortaleza C.E.I.F. footballers
Atlético Bucaramanga footballers
Boca Juniors de Cali footballers
Independiente Medellín footballers
Colombian expatriate sportspeople in Ecuador
Expatriate footballers in Ecuador
People from Popayán
Sportspeople from Cauca Department